DTS or DTs may refer to:

Technology
 DTS (sound system), a group of digital sound technologies owned by the company of the same name
 DTS, Diversified Technical Systems, an American technology company
 Dispatcher training simulator, a computer system for training operators of electrical power grids
 Data Transformation Services, a Microsoft database tool
 Dublin Tech Summit, an annual international technology conference held in Dublin, Ireland
 Distributed temperature sensing, an optoelectronic temperature sensing device
 Digital Temperature Sensor, part of Intel's DTS/PECI
 Distributed transmission system, in broadcasting, as a form of single-frequency network
 Diplomatic Telecommunications Service, a U.S. Department of State telecommunications network
 Discoverable Taxonomy Set, part of Extensible Business Reporting Language (XBRL)
 Defense Travel System, the U.S. military's web-based travel system
 Declaration for TypeScript, a file format to describe JavaScript modules to TypeScript
 Digital tomosynthesis, a medical imaging technique

Organizations
 Dallas Theological Seminary, a Christian seminary in Dallas, Texas
 Discipleship Training School, a missionary training school offered by Youth with a Mission
 Detective Training School, a training school for Bangladesh Police

Other
 Decline to State, a no-party (independent) designation in California voting registration
 Cadillac DTS, a full-size luxury automobile produced by General Motors
 Delirium tremens or DTs, the symptoms associated with alcohol withdrawal
 Destin Executive Airport (FAA lid:DTS)
 Dictionnaire du théâtre en Suisse, an encyclopedia
 Disneytoon Studios, a defunct animation studio which was owned by Disney
 Downtown Summerlin (shopping center), in Summerlin, Las Vegas 
 Formula 1: Drive to Survive, a Netflix documentary series